Lloyd Michael Sabin (born 22 June 1994) is an English former first-class cricketer.

Sabin was born in Banbury, Oxfordshire, in 1994. He was educated at both The Warriner School and Chipping Norton School, before going up to Oxford Brookes University. While studying at Oxford Brookes he played first-class cricket for Oxford MCCU from 2013 to 2015, making six appearances. He scored 190 runs at an average of 17.27 across his six matches, with a high score of 50. In addition to playing first-class cricket, Sabin also played minor counties cricket for Oxfordshire between 2009 and 2013, making 38 appearances in the Minor Counties Championship, alongside 27 and two appearances in the MCCA Knockout Trophy and Minor Counties Twenty20, respectively.

References

External links

1994 births
Living people
Sportspeople from Banbury
Alumni of Oxford Brookes University
English cricketers
Oxfordshire cricketers
Oxford MCCU cricketers